The Midland Football League was a semi-professional football league in the English football league system.

History
The league was established as the Staffordshire Senior League in 1984, taking its clubs from Staffordshire and the areas immediately adjacent. When the league wanted to raise its profile, and attract clubs from a wider area, the decision was made to rename the league as the "Midland League" with effect from the 1994–95 season. It became a feeder to the North West Counties League.

The "new" Midland League consisted of two divisions for the first three seasons, and from 1997 a single grouping. With a merger with the Staffordshire County League in 2005, the new competition became known as the Staffordshire County Senior League, and the Midland League title again fell into disuse.

Champions

1984–85: Eastwood Hanley
1985–86: Rocester
1986–87: Rocester
1987–88: Redgate Clayton
1988–89: Meir KA
1989–90: Eccleshall
1990–91: Meir KA
1991–92: Redgate Clayton
1992–93: Redgate Clayton
1993–94: Redgate Clayton
1994–95: Ball Haye Green
1995–96: Leek CSOB
1996–97: Norton United
1997–98: Audley
1998–99: Norton United
1999–2000: Stone Dominoes
2000–01: Norton United
2001–02: Eccleshall
2002–03: Eccleshall
2003–04: Abbey Hulton United
2004–05: Hanley Town

References

 
Defunct football leagues in England
Football in Staffordshire
1984 establishments in England
2005 disestablishments in England